A washing mitt is a piece of terry cloth shaped like a pouch that the hand fits in. It is used as a type of washcloth to aid in washing the body, for example, to apply soap to the body, and to remove the soap with a rinsed out washing mitt. It can also be used to freshen up the face. Usually, a  towel is used to dry off the body afterwards.

A washing mitt is especially useful for people who like to wash themselves at a sink, and do not wish to spill or waste much water.
The washing mitt is also a good tool for nurses and caregivers, who wash their patients in their beds.
An expansion on the washing mitt is the showercloth, with which also the back can be washed.
There are also special sponges which can be used in the shower, or in the bathtub, in combination with a shower gel. 

In the case of bruises or injuries, a washing mitt can be filled with ice, so that it can be used as an ice bag.

Washing mitts are mostly used in the Netherlands, Belgium, France, Germany, Iran and Korea. Wash cloths are commonly used in Korea both at home and within their public bathhouses. These are famous for being frequently used in public baths in Iran and being the nickname of second football team in there, Esteghlal, as both are common in blue color.  In the rest of the world, wash cloths are in wider use.

An alternative name for the washing mitt is washglove.

See also
Dishcloth
Peshtamal
Terrycloth

Bathing
Linens
Personal hygiene products